Paskhan Rural District is a rural district (dehestan) in the Central District of Darab County, Fars Province, Iran. At the 2006 census, its population was 10,977, in 2,529 families.  The rural district has 17 villages.

References 

Rural Districts of Fars Province
Darab County